The rufous finesnout ctenotus (Ctenotus rufescens)  is a species of skink found in Western Australia.

References

rufescens
Reptiles described in 1979
Taxa named by Glen Milton Storr